The Karachi School of Business and Leadership (KSBL) is a premier and HEC recognized independent degree awarding business school located in the heart of Karachi, Pakistan, established in 2009, under the charter of Sindh Government of Pakistan, 2012. KSBL is located on Stadium Road. The campus facilitates its students through modern teaching methodologies and latest technologies.

Inception 
KSBL is sponsored by Karachi Education Initiative (KEI), a not-for-profit organization consisting of prominent private sector individuals belonging to industrial and financial groups in Pakistan.

Campus 
KSBL campus was designed by William McDonough Partners renowned architects, and champions of sustainability. The campus was designed to bring natural light and open spaces encouraging enhanced learning. It also provides a fully equipped library, modular classrooms, an auditorium, and seminar rooms to promote modern teaching methodologies.

Programs 
KSBL offers its students a wide variety of learning programs and access to Ph.D. faculty to prepare them for future leadership opportunities and the dynamic environment of the various industries.

- MBA Program: The MBA program at KSBL is designed to engage the students to learn through research-based teaching methodologies. The industry focused learning provides perspectives on how organizations can turn challenges into great opportunities. The focus of the MBA Program is on Fintech, Digital Marketing, Talent Management, Supply Chain.

- Executive MBA (EMBA): The Executive MBA program at KSBL provides entrepreneurs, professionals and industry specialists with skills that enhance functional expertise and management capabilities to prepare them for future leadership roles. The EMBA program focuses on Digital Marketing, Fintech, Talent Management, Supply Chain.

- MS in Business Analytics: The MS in Business Analytics program was launched in 2021 at KSBL. The degree program focuses on providing data reading skills and capabilities to coaches, managers, and leaders so that they can turn numbers and data into meaningful insights. 

- BS in Management, Entrepreneurship, and Business Administration (MEBA): BS in Management, Entrepreneurship and Business Administration is an undergraduate program at KSBL that focuses on providing students a holistic learning opportunity, professional grooming, and critical thinking skills into the fields of Marketing, Finance and Human Resources.
- BS in Information Technology & Systems: The BS in Information Technology & Systems program at KSBL is a 4-year extensive training for students exploring a career in information technology. This undergraduate program prepares the students for the dynamic and changing IT industry, Software Design, and innovative data management.

- KSBL Executive Education Program Areas: The Executive Education program at KSBL offers a unique learning opportunity for professionals, business owners, leaders, and managers to prepare for advancement to the next step in their career. With a keen focus on research-based industry knowledge the faculty at KSBL is able to provide deep understanding in the fields of Strategy, Leadership, Personal Development, Finance, Digital Channels and General Management. The programs offered provide a supportive and challenging context where participants acquire the knowledge and skills necessary for career progression. The portfolio of courses cover key management disciplines of strategy, organizational behavior, marketing, operations, and finance. Specialty courses are offered in human resource management, health management and policy, public administration, entrepreneurship, energy and sustainability, innovation, and program management.

Centers of Excellence 
- Ethical Leadership: The center of Ethical Leadership at KSBL is a research hub to develop frameworks and curriculum for building values for future leaders to harness an environment of strong ethical culture for corporate governance and stewardship. The center draws its inspiration from the hadith, narrated by Abdullah bin Amr: The Prophet used to say "The best amongst you are those who have the best manners and character.“ Sahih al-Bukhari 3559. 
Based on Ethical Leadership Framework on two domains 'Character' & 'Good manners', the center develops research based curriculum for ethical training modules, diagnostic tools, implementation of intervention strategies for value driven change for ethical cultures. The center works with other universities, subject matter experts and a team of content developers and facilitators for implementing Organizational Development Initiatives for sustainable success.

- Circular Economy: With a keen focus on sustainability KSBL in collaboration with Engro Polymer & Chemicals Limited inaugurated center of Circular Economy to serve as a research arm working to develop public policy advocacy and practical experimentation.  KSBL will also design curriculums, short courses around circular economy to include as mandatory subjects for future learning programs.  

- Sustainable Growth & Economy: KSBL is focused on creating sustainable growth driven by innovation through research and public policy advocacy. 
The scope of this center is to develop research and collaboration of agenda, legislative and advocacy agenda, relationships and pursue partnerships with local and international stakeholders. KSBL will also convene round tables and seminars for corporate & government stakeholders as primary target, while academic and other institutional stakeholders as secondary. Focus areas of this center include: Industrialization & productivity, where research will be carried out to select sunrise industries to identify bottlenecks; Trade & regional integration to enhance economic stability; Food security, focusing on output yield issues; Labor Market reforms, new economy -IO4 revolution and Public Private Partnerships to identify areas of opportunity & bottlenecks. 

- Case Research: Center for Case Research at KSBL conducts detailed case studies on local and regional organizations to highlight challenges and solutions in developing economies to aid in teaching methodologies with focus towards human resources, organizational behaviors, strategy, marketing, sales and digitization, finance, and other aspects of workplace. The scope of this center is to develop local cases on the companies highlighting key challenges coupled with major decisions and transformation, conduct problem-based research for organizations, provide review and feedback services to institutes and journals that work on case-development and conduct case writing and teaching workshops.

Faculty  
KSBL has one the most rich, diverse, internationally-acclaimed and award-winning faculty body in business education in Pakistan. KSBL faculty members have accomplished and academic and, professional backgrounds in Accounting, Business, Business Analytics, Economics, Entrepreneurship, Finance, Management, Marketing, Marketing Analytics, Talent Management, Organizational Behavior, Operations Management, Psychology, Supply Chain Management, Computer Science, Computer Engineering, Data Analytics, Electrical Engineering, Industrial Engineering, Systems Design Engineering, Mathematics, Linguistics, etc. These high-profile and high-impact world-class scholars and educators have received their academic and professional training in more than 20 different countries. Together they speak more than 25 languages and hail from scores of different countries.

Awards & Recognitions  
The school was awarded university charter in December 2012 by Sindh Government.

References

External links
 Karachi School of Business and Leadership - official homepage

Business schools in Pakistan
Universities and colleges in Karachi